Lifesblood is the second EP by American metal band Mastodon. It was released on CD in 2001 and vinyl in 2004 by Relapse Records. The title Lifesblood is derived from a lyric in the song "Trampled Under Hoof", which appears on their debut album, Remission.

Since the EP was only printed for a limited time, it has become rare and sought after by Mastodon fans. The limited prints come in a variety of colors, each with a certain amount produced: 100 clear, 500 red, 500 black, and a second press of 500 blue and black.

Content
Lifesblood features re-recordings of five songs from Mastodon's first release, 9 Song Demo. All five tracks later appeared on the compilation album Call of the Mastodon. 

The sample at the beginning of "Shadows That Move" is from the film One Flew Over the Cuckoo's Nest. The sample at the beginning of "Hail to Fire" is from the autobiographical film The Dancin' Outlaw by Jesco "Jesse" White. The samples at the beginning of "We Built This Come Death" and "Battle at Sea" are believed to be taken from recordings of the Nuremberg trials.

The cover artwork features an image of a rebis.

Track listing

Personnel
Brann Dailor − drums, vocals
Brent Hinds − guitar, vocals
Bill Kelliher − guitar
Troy Sanders − bass, vocals

Recorded, mixed, and mastered by Matt Washburn at LedBelly Sound Studio.

Charts

References

Mastodon (band) albums
2001 EPs